The 2016 Seattle Reign FC season is the club's fourth season of play and their fourth season in the National Women's Soccer League, the top division of women's soccer in the United States. The club enters the season as the two-time defending winner of the NWSL Shield.

Club

Coaching staff

Current roster

Competitions

Preseason

International friendlies

Regular season

Regular-season standings

Results summary

Results by matchday

Statistics
Numbers in parentheses denote appearances as substitute.
 * Tostanoski's appearances came while she was still an amateur call-up.

Awards

FIFA FIFPro Women's World11
 Hope Solo

BBC Women's Footballer of the Year

 Kim Little (winner)

The 100 Best Footballers in The World

 No. 4: Kim Little
 No. 22: Jess Fishlock
 No. 40: Hope Solo
 No. 56: Manon Melis

NWSL Season Awards
 Defender of the Year: Lauren Barnes
 Best XI: Lauren Barnes
 Second XI: Jess Fishlock, Kim Little

NWSL Player of the Week
 Week 2: Kim Little (1G, 2A at Boston Breakers)
 Week 3: Kim Little (GWG vs. FC Kansas City)
 Week 11: Nahomi Kawasumi (2G vs. Boston Breakers)
 Week 16: Manon Melis (2G vs. Portland Thorns FC)

NWSL Save of the Week
 Week 14: Kendall Fletcher

Team awards
 Kendall Fletcher, MVP
 Keelin Winters, Unsung Hero
 Manon Melis, Offensive Player of the Year
 Kendall Fletcher, Defensive Player of the Year
 Manon Melis, Golden Boot (7G)
 Megan Rapinoe, Goal of the Year (vs. Portland Thorns FC, August 27)
 Haley Kopmeyer, Best Social Media

Contract extensions

Transfers
For transfers in, dates listed are when the Reign FC officially signed the players to the roster. Transactions where only the rights to the players are acquired (e.g., draft picks) are not listed, and amateur call-ups are not considered official signings either. For transfers out, dates listed are when the Reign FC officially removed the players from its roster, not when they signed with another club. If a player later signed with another club, her new club will be noted, but the date listed here remains the one when she was officially removed from the Reign FC roster.

In

Draft picks 
Draft picks are not automatically signed to the team roster. Only those who are signed to a contract will be listed as transfers in. Only trades involving draft picks and executed during the 2016 NWSL College Draft on January 15, 2016, will be listed in the notes.

Out

Offseason loans
 Lauren Barnes, Melbourne City
 Jess Fishlock, Melbourne City
 Kendall Fletcher, Western Sydney Wanderers
 Nahomi Kawasumi, INAC Kobe Leonessa
 Beverly Yanez, Melbourne City

References

External links

See also

2016 National Women's Soccer League season

OL Reign seasons
Seattle Reign
Seattle Reign
Seattle Reign